Chapter I of the United Nations Charter lays out the purposes and principles of the United Nations organization. These principles include the equality and self-determination of nations, respect of human rights and fundamental freedoms and the obligation of member countries to obey the Charter, to cooperate with the UN Security Council and to use peaceful means to resolve conflicts. These "purposes and principles" reflect a premise that the effectiveness of the United Nations would be enhanced with broad guidelines to guide the actions of its Organisations and member states. However, some members were concerned that these proposals granted what they considered overly broad discretionary powers for the organs of the United Nations in the Dumbarton Oaks Conference proposals. And the adopted purposes and principles have been seen as reflecting the compromise achieved.

Article 1: Purposes of the United Nations
The adopted purposes of the United Nations reflect a premise that are the effective Dumbarton Oaks proposals.  I.e. :"
 To maintain international peace and security, and to that end: to take effective collective measures for the prevention and removal of threats to the peace, and for the suppression of acts of aggression or other breaches of the peace, and to bring about by peaceful means, and in conformity with the principles of justice and international law, adjustment or settlement of international disputes or situations which might lead to a breach of the peace;
 To develop friendly relations among nations based on respect for the principle of equal rights and self-determination of peoples, and to take other appropriate measures to strengthen universal peace;
 To achieve international co-operation in solving international problems of an economic, social, cultural, or humanitarian character, and in promoting and encouraging respect for human rights and for fundamental freedoms for all without distinction as to race, sex, language, or religion; and
 To be a centre for harmonizing the actions of nations in the attainment of these common ends."

Article 2: Principles of the United Nations
"The Organization and its Members, in pursuit of the Purposes stated in Article 1, shall act in accordance with the following Principles.

 The Organization is based on the principle of the sovereign equality of all its Members.
 All Members, in order to ensure to all of them the rights and benefits resulting from membership, shall fulfill in good faith the obligations assumed by them in accordance with the present Charter.
 All Members shall settle their international disputes by peaceful means in such a manner that international peace and security, and justice, are not endangered.
 All Members shall refrain in their international relations from the threat or use of force against the territorial integrity or political independence of any state, or in any other manner inconsistent with the Purposes of the United Nations.
 All Members shall give the United Nations every assistance in any action it takes in accordance with the present Charter, and shall refrain from giving assistance to any state against which the United Nations is taking preventive or enforcement action.
 The Organization shall ensure that states which are not Members of the United Nations act in accordance with these Principles so far as may be necessary for the maintenance of international peace and security.
 Nothing contained in the present Charter shall authorize the United Nations to intervene in matters which are essentially within the domestic jurisdiction of any state or shall require the Members to submit such matters to settlement under the present Charter; but this principle shall not prejudice the application of enforcement measures under Chapter Vll."

Article 2, clauses 3-4 essentially prohibit threat or use of force as well as war (except in self-defense; The right to self-defense is reaffirmed in Article 51, which states, "Nothing in the present Charter shall impair the inherent right of individual or collective self-defense if an armed attack occurs against a Member of the United Nations ...").

Article 2, clauses 4-5 essentially prohibits also (support of) activities against the territorial integrity or political independence of another state (including covert operations).

Article 2, clause 7 of this chapter reemphasizes the fact that only the UN Security Council has the power to force any country to do anything by stating that "Nothing contained in the present Charter shall authorize the United Nations to intervene in matters which are essentially within the domestic jurisdiction of any state or shall require the Members to submit such matters to settlement under the present Charter; but this principle shall not prejudice the application of enforcement measures under Chapter VII." (Only the Security Council can institute Chapter VII enforcement measures.)

See also 
 Crime of aggression
 Universal jurisdiction
 Kellogg-Briand Pact

References 

Divisions and sections of the Charter of the United Nations
United Nations documents